The Fiat A.10 was an Italian 6-cylinder, liquid-cooled, in-line aero engine of World War I.  The A.10 was succeeded by the larger A.12.  Fiat produced over 15,000 engines during World War I.

Applications
 Caproni Ca.1
 Caproni Ca.2
 Caproni Ca.32
 SIA 5

Specifications (Fiat A.10)

See also

References

Further reading
 

A.10
1910s aircraft piston engines